The Big Spring Herald is a newspaper based in Big Spring, Texas, covering the Howard County area of West Texas. It published on weekday afternoons and Sunday mornings. It is owned by Horizon Publications Inc.

The Herald was founded as a weekly in 1904 by brothers-in-law Tom Jordan and W.G. Hayden and became a daily in 1928. In 1929, Harte-Hanks Newspapers bought the paper.

In 2001, Community Newspaper Holdings put the Herald up for sale along with 30 other properties, including fellow West Texas papers the Borger News-Herald and Sweetwater Reporter. Horizon Publications bought the three West Texas papers in 2003.

References

External links

Daily newspapers published in Texas
Howard County, Texas
Publications established in 1904